SCH-5472. is a stimulant drug developed by Schering-Plough in the 1950s.

Synthesis

Potassium amide was made from the reaction of potassium metal with liquid ammonia. The coupling between the carbanion created from diphenylmethane [101-81-5] (1) and ethyl 2-furoate [614-99-3] [1335-40-6] (2) gives 2-furyl benzhydryl ketone, CID:63950182 (3). The was reacted with concentrated liquid ammonia in methanol solvent in an autoclave. The product of this step was 2-benzhydrylpyridin-3-ol, CID:125491889 (4). Reduction of the pyridine gave 2-(diphenylmethyl)piperidin-3-ol, CID:209477 (5).

See also 
 AL-1095
 Desoxypipradrol
 Difemetorex

References 

Stimulants
2-Benzylpiperidines